The Gabali (Gaulish: *Gabli) were a Gallic tribe dwelling in the later Gévaudan region during the Iron Age and the Roman period.

Name 
They are mentioned as Gabalos or Gabalis by Caesar (mid-1st c. BC), as Gabalei͂s (Γαβαλεῖς) by Strabo (early 1st c. AD), as Gabales by Pliny (1st c. AD), and as Tábaloi (Τάβαλοι) by Ptolemy (2nd c. AD).

The ethnonym Gabali is a Latinized form of Gaulish *Gabloi. It derives from the stem  (cf. Olr. gabul, Middle Welsh gafl, OBret. gabl), initially designating the 'forked branch of a tree', then more generally a 'fork'. The name is related to the Gallo-Latin *gabalottus ('spear'), which may have given the word javelot in French.

The city of Javols, attested ca. 400 AD as civitas Gabalum ('civitas of the Gabali', Javols in 1109), and the Gévaudan region, attested in the 1st c. AD as Gabalicus pagus (Gavuldanum in the 10th c., Gavalda in the 13th c.), are named after the Gallic tribe.

Geography 
The Gabali dwelled in the Gévaudan region, on the north-western foot of the Cevennes. Their territory was located south of the Arveni, and north of the Ruteni.

Their chief town was Anderitum (present-day Javols).

History 
They were subject, and allied to the Averni. They are mentioned in Book VII of Caesar's Commentaries. During Caesar's conquest of Gaul they were raiding the country of the Provincial Ruteni, and they were among the tribes that sent relief troops to the Gallic army trying to break the siege in Alesia.

Economy 
The Gabali were cattle breeder. Many of them were also miners as their region was rich in silver mines.

References

Bibliography 

 
Historical Celtic peoples
Gauls
Tribes of pre-Roman Gaul